Otostrongylus is a monotypic genus of nematodes belonging to the family Crenosomatidae. The only species is Otostrongylus circumlitus.

The species is found in Europe and Northern America.

References

Nematodes